Shūhei, Shuhei or Shuuhei (written: 周平, 修平, 秀平, 脩平 or シュウヘイ in katakana) is a masculine Japanese given name. Notable people with the name include:

, Japanese footballer
, Japanese motorcycle racer
Shuhei Fujioka (potter) (born 1947), Japanese potter
, Japanese writer
, Japanese baseball player
, Japanese footballer
, Japanese ice hockey player
, Japanese sumo wrestler
, Japanese rugby union player
, Japanese automotive engineer
, Japanese Magic: The Gathering player
, Japanese musician and composer
, Japanese pole vaulter
, Japanese footballer
, Japanese voice actor
, Japanese footballer
, Japanese sprinter
, Japanese baseball player
, Japanese baseball player
, Japanese professional wrestler
, Japanese footballer
, Japanese Go player
, Japanese footballer
, Japanese businessman

Fictional characters
 Shuhei Hisagi, a character from the manga series Bleach

Japanese masculine given names